The 1963 NCAA University Division basketball tournament involved 25 schools playing in single-elimination play to determine the national champion of men's NCAA Division I college basketball in the United States. It began on March 9, 1963, and ended with the championship game on March 23 in Louisville, Kentucky. A total of 29 games were played, including a third-place game in each region and a national third-place game.

Loyola University Chicago, coached by George Ireland, won the national title with a 60–58 overtime victory in the final game, over the University of Cincinnati, coached by Ed Jucker. Art Heyman, of Duke University, was named the tournament's Most Outstanding Player.  This tournament marked the last time that a city was host to two straight Final Fours.

Locations

For the fourth time, Louisville and Freedom Hall hosted the Final Four, the last time a host repeated in back-to-back years. Like the preceding year, all nine venues were either on-campus arenas or the primary off-campus arena for college teams. The tournament saw three new venues being used. For the first time, the tournament came to the state of Michigan, when Jenison Fieldhouse on the campus of Michigan State University hosted games for the first and only time. (All other games held in the state have been in the Detroit metropolitan area.) Texas saw its third host city become Lubbock, when the Municipal Coliseum at Texas Technological College hosted games for the first time. And for the first time, the University of Oregon hosted the tournament at historic McArthur Court, something it would do twice more. Of the nine venues used, only Jenison Fieldhouse would not be used again.

Teams

Bracket
* – Denotes overtime period

East region

Mideast region

Midwest region

West region

Final Four

Notes

 In the Loyola vs. Mississippi State game at East Lansing, Michigan in a Mideast regional semifinal, Mississippi State, an all-white team, played despite protests from the governor and state police of Mississippi. Mississippi State overcame a state prohibition against playing integrated teams. Loyola beat Mississippi State and went on to the Mideast Region Championship game. The Loyola–Mississippi State has since been dubbed the "Game of Change".
 In the National Championship game, Loyola started four African-Americans and Cincinnati started three, marking the first time that a majority of African-Americans participated in the championship game.
 Loyola was the tenth and, as of 2022, most recent team to win the tournament in their first appearance, joining Oregon (1939), Indiana (1940), Wisconsin (1941), Stanford (1942), Utah (1944), Oklahoma State (1945), Holy Cross (1947), La Salle (1954) and San Francisco (1955).
 Loyola's first-round regional victory over Tennessee Tech, 111–42, continues to be a record margin of victory for an NCAA men's basketball tournament game. That game also remains Tennessee Tech's most recent tournament game, as the Golden Eagles have not been back since. Tennessee Tech's 59 year drought is the second longest active drought after Dartmouth, who has not made the tournament since 1959, and third all-time behind Dartmouth and Harvard, who went 66 years (1946-2012) between tournament appearances.
In addition to Loyola, two other teams - Mississippi State and Texas Western - both made their tournament debuts. The Bulldogs had been eligible three times before (in 1959, 1961 and 1962, the last year being tied with Kentucky), but all three times had been prohibited by the state due to its prohibition against playing integrated teams. Texas Western, who were an independent team following the disbandment of the Border Conference the year prior, lost their first tournament game to in-state rival Texas, whom they had beaten 45-40 on December 29 at home. They would also make history three years later when they won the 1966 tournament with an all-black starting five.

See also
 1963 NCAA College Division basketball tournament
 1963 National Invitation Tournament
 1963 NAIA Division I men's basketball tournament
 Black participation in college basketball

References

NCAA Division I men's basketball tournament
Ncaa
Basketball competitions in Louisville, Kentucky
NCAA
NCAA University Division basketball tournament
Basketball competitions in Lubbock, Texas